The men's marathon event at the 1999 All-Africa Games was held in the streets of Johannesburg.

Results

References

Athletics at the 1999 All-Africa Games
1999 Men